La Salle University may refer to:
 La Salle University based in Philadelphia, Pennsylvania
 La Salle Extension University, former correspondence/distance learning school founded in Chicago, Illinois
 LaSalle University, based in Louisiana (formerly Missouri), one of several James Kirk diploma mills

Brazil
 La Salle University (Universidade La Salle), in Canoas, Rio Grande do Sul

Colombia
La Salle University, Colombia, based in Bogotá

Indonesia
De La Salle Catholic University, Manado

Mexico
Universidad La Salle, based in Mexico City
La Salle University of Chihuahua, a campus based on Chihuahua, Chihuahua

Philippines
De La Salle Araneta University, based in Malabon
De La Salle Medical and Health Sciences Institute, based in Dasmariñas
De La Salle University, based in Malate, Manila
De La Salle University – Dasmariñas, based in Dasmariñas
La Salle University (Ozamiz), based in Ozamiz
University of St. La Salle, based in Bacolod

See also
 La Sallian educational institutions
 De La Salle Academy (disambiguation)
 La Salle High School (disambiguation)
 De La Salle High School (disambiguation)
 De La Salle College (disambiguation)
 De La Salle (disambiguation)
 La Salle (disambiguation)